"Never Gonna Let You Go" is a song by American singer Faith Evans. It was written and produced by Damon Thomas and Kenneth "Babyface" Edmonds for her album Keep the Faith (1998). The song spent one week at number 1 on the US Hot R&B/Hip-Hop Songs chart.

Critical reception
Allmusic editor Jose F. Promis called "Never Gonna Let You Go" a "beautiful" song, "which could be classified as the last great Babyface hit song of the 1990s."

Music video
A music video for "Never Gonna Let You Go" was shot outside San Francisco with director Marcus Raboy.

Credits and personnel 
Credits adapted from the liner notes of Keep the Faith.

 Babyface – songwriter, producer, programming, background vocals
 E'lyk – assistant mixer
 Nathan East – bass
 Faith Evans – vocals
 Jon Gass – mixer
 Kenya Ivey – background vocals

 Tavia Ivey – background vocals
 Ricky Lawson – drums (toms)
 Greg Phillinganes – piano
 Paul Boutin – recording engineer
 Damon Thomas – songwriter, producer, keyboards, drum programming
 Michael Thompson – guitar

Charts

Weekly charts

Year-end charts

See also
 List of number-one R&B singles of 1999 (U.S.)

References

1999 singles
Bad Boy Records singles
Faith Evans songs
Music videos directed by Marcus Raboy
Song recordings produced by Babyface (musician)
Songs written by Babyface (musician)
1998 songs
Songs written by Damon Thomas (record producer)
Contemporary R&B ballads
Soul ballads
1990s ballads